Mohammed Al-Shanqiti (born March 15, 1999) is a Saudi Arabian  professional footballer who currently plays for Al-Jabalain as a left-back.

Career

Al-Ansar
Mohammed Al-Shanqeeti graduated in Al-Ansar until the beginning of 2017.

Al-Nassr
On 10 January 2018, Al-Nassr signed  Al-Shanqeeti for one season from Al-Ansar.

Al-Taawoun
On 24 August 2019, Al-Shanqiti joined Al-Taawoun on a season-long loan from Al-Nassr. He made his debut for Al-Taawoun on 1 October 2019 in the match against Al-Ittihad replacing the injured Talal Al-Absi.

Al-Tai
On 31 January 2020, Al-Shanqiti joined Al-Tai on a half season-long loan from Al-Nassr.

Al-Ain
On 3 September 2021, Al-Shanqiti joined Al-Ain.

Al-Jabalain
On 23 June 2022, Al-Shanqiti joined Al-Jabalain.

Career statistics

Club

Honours

International
Saudi Arabia U20
 AFC U-19 Championship: 2018

References

External links

1999 births
Saudi Arabian footballers
Saudi Arabia youth international footballers
People from Medina
Living people
Al-Ansar FC (Medina) players
Al Nassr FC players
Al-Taawoun FC players
Al-Tai FC players
Al-Ain FC (Saudi Arabia) players
Al-Jabalain FC players
Saudi Professional League players
Saudi First Division League players
Association football defenders